An erne is a sea eagle, or an eagle more broadly.

Erne may refer to:

People 
 Adam Erne (born 1995), American ice hockey player
 Philippe Erne (born 1986), Liechtenstein footballer
 Young Erne (1884–1944), American boxer

Ships 
 HMS Erne, various ships of Britain's Royal Navy
 Erne (ship), a 1886 British (later Canadian) ship that transported Indian labourers

Other 
 Erne, a type of shot in the game of Pickleball
 Erne Integrated College, Enniskillen, Northern Ireland
 Earl Erne, a title in the peerage of Ireland
 Lough Erne, two connected lakes in Ireland
 River Erne, a river in Ireland
  (National Solidarity of Ertzainas, known as ErNE) a workers union of the Ertzaintza (police of the Basque Country)

See also
Ern (disambiguation)
Ernes, a commune in France
Shannon–Erne Waterway, a canal in Ireland